Janine Rozier (born April 13, 1938) is a former member of the Senate of France, who represented the Loiret department. She is a member of the Union for a Popular Movement.

References
Page on the Senate website 

1938 births
Living people
Union for a Popular Movement politicians
French Senators of the Fifth Republic
Women members of the Senate (France)
21st-century French women politicians
Senators of Loiret